Rustam Kalimullin (born 2 January 1958, Kazaklar, Sabinsky District) is a Russian political figure and deputy of the 8th State Duma. In 1996 Kalimullin was awarded a Candidate of agricultural sciences degree.

From 1992 to 1999, Kalimullin was the head of the Tyulyachinsky District. Later he served as a chairman of the Board of the Union of Consumer Societies of the Republic of Tatarstan (1999-2002) and as deputy of the State Council of the Republic of Tatarstan of the 2nd convocation (2002-2004). In 2002 he was appointed head of the administration of the Mamadyshsky District, and in 2006 he became the head of the municipality. From 2010 to 2021, he headed the Vysokogorsky District. Since September 2021, he has served as a deputy of the 8th State Duma. He is a member of the State Duma Committee on Physical Culture and Sports.

He is one of the members of the State Duma the United States Treasury sanctioned on 24 March 2022 in response to the 2022 Russian invasion of Ukraine.

Awards 
 Order "For Merit to the Fatherland"

References

1958 births
Living people
United Russia politicians
21st-century Russian politicians
Eighth convocation members of the State Duma (Russian Federation)
Russian individuals subject to the U.S. Department of the Treasury sanctions